The  is an electric multiple unit (EMU) train type operated by the Tokyo subway operator Tokyo Metropolitan Bureau of Transportation (Toei) on the Toei Mita Line in Tokyo, Japan, between 1968 and 1999, and subsequently on the Chichibu Railway (since 1999), Kumamoto Electric Railway, and Kereta Commuter Indonesia in Indonesia (from 2000 until 2016).

Operations
The 6000 series operated on the Toei Mita Line from its opening in 1968.

History
The 6000 series won the 1969 Laurel Prize from the Japan Railfan Club.

Exterior
Originally delivered with unpainted stainless steel front ends, the blue bodyside bands were extended to the front ends from 1988.

Interior

Resale

Following withdrawal from the Toei Mita Line in 1999 and replacement by Toei 6300 series EMUs, a number of former 6000 series units were resold to other railway operators in Japan and also donated to KA Commuter Jabodetabek (at the time, it was Jabotabek Urban Transport Division)  in Indonesia.
 Chichibu Railway 5000 series 3-car sets
 Kumamoto Electric Railway 6000 series 2-car sets
 KRL Jabodetabek 6000 series

Chichibu Railway 5000 series

12 former 6000 series cars were sold to the Chichibu Railway in 1999, where they were reformed as four three-car 5000 series sets.

The original Toei car numbers and subsequent identities were as follows.

Indonesia
72 former 6000 series cars were donated to KRL Jabotabek (later KA Commuter Jabodetabek) in Indonesia in 2000 as part of an Official development assistance (ODA) programme to upgrade commuter train services in the Jakarta area.

Eight six-car sets (6121, 6151, 6161, 6171, 6181, 6201, 6271, and 6281) and 24 middle cars were shipped to Indonesia, entering revenue service there from August 2000. In 2004, the trainsets were reformed into eight six-car sets and three eight-car sets, made possible by rebuilding some former intermediate cars with new driving cabs. These new driving cab would be called "Rakitan", "Lohan" , & "Espass"  The fleet subsequently underwent further extensive reorganization and rebuilding of driving cars damaged in accidents.

Withdrawals commenced in December 2012 with set 6201, displaced by an increasing number of newer and longer trains delivered from Japan like: Tokyo Metro 6000 series, Tokyo Metro 05 series, and 203 series. The last set to remain in service, 6181, was repainted into the new KA Commuter Jabodetabek red livery in February 2016, before finally being withdrawn in September 2016.

Since February 2018, car 6181 from the last operating set, 6181F, is now preserved in Depok EMU Depot as a static display, with electrical systems such as lighting and automatic door fully operational, due to some modifications to the train.

Gallery

See also 
 KAI Commuter

References

External links

 Toei rolling stock gallery 

Electric multiple units of Japan
Toei Subway
Train-related introductions in 1968
Electric multiple units of Indonesia
Kawasaki multiple units
Hitachi multiple units
1500 V DC multiple units of Japan
Nippon Sharyo multiple units
Alna Koki rolling stock